Nubt may refer to any of several ancient cities in Egypt, including:

Nubt, capital of its own nome, now Kom Ombo, Egypt
Nubt, now Naqada, Egypt